"Starmaker" is a song  written by Bruce Roberts and Carole Bayer Sager for Roberts' self-titled album in 1977. It was later popularized in 1982 as the second single by The Kids from "Fame", the recording group of the Fame TV series based on the 1980 film of the same name. The Kids from "Fame" released five albums and five singles in the UK between 1982 and 1983 with music featured in the TV show. The group's self-titled debut album was released in July 1982 which topped the UK Albums Chart for twelve weeks. Their debut single "Hi Fidelity" was released and this reached number 5 while their second single "Starmaker" entered the UK charts at number 38, then stayed on the charts for 10 weeks peaking at number 3, the highest charting of The Kids from "Fame"'s singles. In 1983 the song reached fifth place in the Dutch chart, with nine weeks in total. In the United States,  WIFI -AM- Philadelphia deemed it a Playlist Top Add-on.

According to The Radio Times, the scene has added poignancy due to the fact that actor Michael Thoma was nearing the end of his battle against cancer.

The cast performed the song at the 21 October 1982 episode of Top of the Pops, and included it as the fifth track in their The Kids from Fame Live! concert and album in 1983.

In 2003, some of the cast members were reunited by the BBC for a special programme, in which the group performed "Starmaker" to a piano arrangement by Lee Curreri who played Bruno Martelli in the series.

The song has also been covered in Paul Anka's 1978 album Listen to Your Heart Judy Collins' 1979 album Hard Times for Lovers, and Lindsay Shawn & Maxdown's 2014 album, Vintage Ballads.

References

1977 songs
1982 singles
Bruce Roberts (singer) songs